The 2018 Cuyahoga County Council election was held on November 6, 2018 to elect members of the County Council of Cuyahoga County, Ohio. Odd-numbered districts were up for election to four-year terms, while District 10 held a special election to fill out the remainder of Anthony Hairston's term following his election to Cleveland City Council in 2017.

Republicans defended both of their seats up for election, while Democrats defended all 5 of theirs, maintaining the partisan balance in the chamber.

District 1

Republican primary

Primary results

General election

Results

District 3

Democratic primary

Primary results

General election

Results

District 5

Republican primary

Primary results

General election

Results

District 7

Democratic primary

Primary results

General election

Results

District 9

Democratic primary

Primary results

General election

Results

District 10

Democratic primary

Primary results

General election

Results

District 11

Democratic primary

Primary results

General election

Results

References

Cuyahoga County Council
Cuyahoga County Council
2018 Council
Cuyahoga County Council